In finance, a class A share refers to a share classification of common or preferred stock that typically has enhanced benefits with respect to dividends, asset sales, or voting rights compared to Class B or Class C shares. There may be restrictions on any specific issue of class A shares in exchange for the benefits; for example, preferences with regard to dividends may be traded for reduced voting rights. They are often convertible into class B (may not be publicly traded) shares at a favorable rate.

For example, a company might allocate class A shares to its management giving them 7 times face value of class B shares, while class B shares have the same voting right as class A shares.  Companies classify stock for many reasons. In some cases this is to give company insiders a greater degree of power over the company and to provide a better defense against events like hostile takeover attempts.

Class A share is also a way of pricing sales charges (loads) on mutual funds in the United States. In a class A share, the sales load is up front, typically at most 5.75% of the amount invested. In contrast is the class B share that does not have an upfront charge, but instead has higher ongoing expenses in the form of a higher 12B-1 fee, and a contingent deferred sales charge that only applies if the investor redeems shares before a specified period. The maximum A share sales load is decreased for larger investment amounts as a volume discount.

See also
 Outline of finance
 A-share (mainland China)
 Series A round

References 

Equity securities